Tadmor prison was located in Palmyra (Tadmor in Arabic) in the deserts of eastern Syria approximately 200 kilometers northeast of Damascus.

Tadmor prison was known for harsh conditions, extensive human rights abuse, torture and summary executions. A 2001 report by Amnesty International called it a source of "despair, torture and degrading treatment."

It was captured and destroyed by militants of the Islamic State of Iraq and the Levant (ISIL) in May 2015.

History

Founding
The structures were originally built as military barracks by the French Mandate forces.

Prison massacre
During the 1980s, Tadmor prison housed thousands of Syrian prisoners, both political and criminal and it was also the scene of the June 27, 1980 Tadmor Prison massacre of prisoners by Rifaat al-Assad, the day after the Syrian branch of the Islamist Muslim Brotherhood narrowly failed in an attempt to assassinate his brother, president Hafez al-Assad. Members of units of the Defence Brigades, under the command of Rifaat al-Assad, entered Tadmor Prison at dawn and murdered an estimated thousand prisoners in the cells and the dormitories. The massacre is well known throughout Syria.

Closure and reopening
Tadmor prison was closed in 2001 and all remaining detainees were transferred to other prisons in Syria. Tadmor Prison was reopened on June 15, 2011, and 350 individuals arrested for participation in anti-government demonstrations were transferred there for interrogation and detainment.

Destruction
In May 2015, Tadmur was captured by the Islamic State of Iraq and the Levant who also took over the prison and released a video of its interior. ISIL militants used explosives to blow up the prison complex on 30 May.

See also

Adra Prison
Hama massacre
Human rights in Syria
List of massacres in Syria

References

External links
A 1996 Human Rights Watch report on Tadmor prison

Defunct prisons in Syria
Torture in Syria
Buildings and structures in Homs Governorate
Palmyra
Buildings and structures demolished in 2015
Buildings and structures destroyed by ISIL
2015 in the Syrian civil war